The Association des Travailleurs Grecs du Québec (ATGQ) (English: Greek Workers's Association of Quebec) is an association in Montreal, Quebec, that represents the city's working-class Greek immigrant community.

History

The association was founded on March 3, 1971, by progressive members of the Greek diaspora, in opposition to the official diaspora organizations that were at the time aligned with the military regime ruling Greece. Its first offices were at the Montreal YMCA on 5550 Avenue du Parc. It has been housed in its current location since 1979.

The association is broadly supportive of various progressive, labour, and anti-imperialist causes, such as Palestinian solidarity, Cuban solidarity, opposition to war, opposition to mining, and the movement to increase the minimum wage.

See also
Greek Canadians

References

External links

Official website
Official Facebook page

1971 establishments in Quebec
Anti-imperialism in North America
Anti-imperialist organizations
Anti-racism in Canada
Anti-racist organizations in Canada
European-Canadian culture in Montreal
Greek-Canadian culture
Labour movement in Canada
Overseas Greek organisations
Palestinian solidarity movement
Working-class culture in Canada